Bryan Inc. (broadcast under the title Renovation, Inc. in the U.S.) is a HGTV Canada home building, home renovation, business reality television, and homelife reality TV show. It focuses on the Baeumler family, and the construction business established by Bryan Baeumler, with his wife Sarah joining the business as a designer, to start on building new homes and buying older homes to flip and rebuild into premium properties to sell. Bryan Inc. is a follow-up to the HGTV Canada show House of Bryan, which followed the Baeumlers as they built various houses that they themselves would live in.

The 2016 series premiere had the then highest rated season premiere on HGTV Canada of the last 5 years. The 2018 second season became the highest rated show on HGTV Canada.

After the success of Renovation Island ("Island of Bryan") on HGTV USA, Bryan Inc. was licensed and reformed as Renovation, Inc., starting broadcast on the U.S. HGTV on 30 August 2020. Season 1 was reformatted from 13 episodes to 7 episodes.

Premise
For season 1, the show focuses on Bryan's construction company, with wife Sarah joining the company; and Bryan and Sarah's home life with their 4 children. At the company, they will buy, renovate, and then sell houses, to turn a profit.

History
Bryan Inc. was greenlit in 2015, for the fall 2016 season on HGTV Canada. It was successor to previous series House of Bryan; and also following on from Leave It to Bryan, combining aspects of both. Leave it to Bryan suspended production with the start of Bryan Inc. The season 1 series order was for 13 episodes in a 60-minute timeslot. Like the two predecessors, Bryan Inc. was also produced by Si Entertainment. The show features Bryan Baeumler, his construction company, wife Sarah, and their children. Sarah becomes involved in Bryan's company as a designer. The show premiered on 25 September 2016. The series premiere was the highest rated premiere on HGTV Canada for the last five years.

Before the start of the second season, the successor was announced as Island of Bryan. The Royal Bank of Canada was integrated into the second season, with custom commercials featuring the stars during the commercial breaks, and its products also featuring in the episodes. For the second season, Sarah Baeumler increases her role inside the company, becoming a project manager. Season two would also be a 13 episode season filling a 60-minute timeslot. Season 2 became the highest rated specialty entertainment program on HGTV Canada.

Cast
The show cast primary consisted of Bryan Baeumler and his family.
 Bryan Baeumler — builder, business owner
 Sarah Baeumler — designer
 Quentyn "Q" Baeumler — eldest son
 Charlotte Baeumler — eldest daughter
 Lincoln "Link" Baeumler — youngest son
 Josephine "JoJo" Baeumler — youngest daughter
 Adam Weir — Bryan's apprentice

Episodes

Overview

Season 1

Season 2

Business

The business that the show revolves around is Baeumler Quality Construction (BQC), co-founded by Bryan Baeumler, a home construction business that does new builds and renovations; a full-service construction and renovation firm. The company operates in the Greater Toronto Area of Ontario, Canada; and is based in Burlington and Oakville.

BQC was founded in 2008 by a merger of Bryan Baeumler's contracting business with Stuart Bailey's cabinetry business, and went on to grow into one of the largest construction companies in Ontario. Along with construction, cabinetry, and media arms, BQC also has Baeumler Approved certification for local contractors to give recommendations to handle overload work that BQC cannot handle themselves due to excess demand, and BQC Family Foundation for charitable works involving children.

References

External links
 
Bryan Inc. on HGTV Canada
Bryan Inc. on Corus Entertainment
Baeumler Construction

HGTV (Canada) original programming
2016 Canadian television series debuts
2010s Canadian reality television series
Bryan Baeumler television franchise
English-language television shows